is a video game for the Super Nintendo Entertainment System released in Japan on December 23, 1993, and in North America in July 1994. It is based on Toho's Godzilla franchise and was developed by Advance Communication Company.

Gameplay
The player must guide Godzilla into the different levels by pressing the adequate button in the appropriate place. The game is split in two screens: the top one shows the actions Godzilla is making at the moment, while the bottom one shows his location on the current level. When Godzilla finds a monster to battle, the game switches into a standard side-view fighting segment.

Playable monsters
Godzilla - Defender of Japan, the atomic dinosaur that once destroyed civilization became humanity's only hope for survival. In his quest to rid the Earth of its aggressors, Godzilla was aided by a small band of humans that controlled the King of the Monsters as he faces other monsters.
Super Godzilla (Japanese Name: 超ゴジラ)- After King Ghidorah was resurrected as Mecha-King Ghidorah, the human characters determined that Godzilla must increase in power, and so Godzilla had to seek out the three capsules of Super S energy, only then would the monster transform into the godly stature of Super Godzilla. After defeating Mecha-King Ghidorah, Bagan, the ultimate enemy monster of the game appeared and Godzilla again changed into Super Godzilla in order to combat him.

Enemy monsters
King Ghidorah
Mechagodzilla (the Japanese version has the Heisei Mechagodzilla; the US version has the original Showa Mechagodzilla as Godzilla vs. Mechagodzilla II had not released internationally yet.)
Biollante
Battra
Mecha-King Ghidorah
Bagan- a monster that was originally supposed to fight Godzilla and Mothra in various proposed films. 
UFO (must battle them consistently beginning in Stage 2 unless Godzilla finds and destroys the Mothership in each stage)

Story
When King Ghidorah suddenly attacks Osaka, the military deploys the Super X II to locate Godzilla, and they use a transmitter to control the mutant dinosaur. Godzilla is led to Osaka, where he fights and kills King Ghidorah. Immediately afterwards, Ghidorah's body vanishes and an alien spaceship appears. The invaders reveal that they were controlling Ghidorah, and demand that the human race surrender. Meanwhile, another Godzilla appears in Mt. Fuji, and the Super X II lures the real Godzilla there to fight it. Godzilla confronts the new Godzilla, who is revealed to be Mechagodzilla wearing an artificial skin. During Godzilla's fight with the robot, the aliens kidnap Dr. Shiragami and take him to Lake Ashino. Godzilla goes there to rescue the professor, and is confronted by Biollante, his plant-like clone. After defeating Biollante, the Super X II rescues Shiragami, it is revealed that the doctor had recovered DNA samples of Godzilla and King Ghidorah and had been experimenting on them to create a serum that enhances the physical attributes of any being. However, the aliens invaded his laboratory and stole the samples, using them to create Biollante.

Dr. Shiragami injects some of the serum into Godzilla, making him stronger. The aliens unleash Battra in Yokohama, and it lays an egg that is threatening to hatch. Godzilla travels to Yokohama, kills Battra, and destroys the egg before it can hatch. King Ghidorah soon returns as Mecha-King Ghidorah, having been resurrected by the aliens, and begins to attack Yokohama. The aliens reveal that they have hidden several capsules around the city that are holding Shiragami's serum. If Godzilla can find them all before Mecha-King Ghidorah destroys fifty percent of the city, he will mutate into a more powerful form dubbed "Super Godzilla." He succeeds, and confronts Mecha-King Ghidorah. The cyborg monster is easily outmatched by Godzilla's newfound power and is destroyed. However, the battle is far from over. The aliens travel to China, where they awaken an ancient creature called Bagan and inject him with sample of the serum, making him just as powerful as Godzilla. The two titans battle in the ruins of Yokohama, and Bagan proves to be more challenging than all the other monsters he faced. Eventually, Godzilla bests Bagan, and the aliens retreat, but not before promising revenge. The serum eventually wears off, and Godzilla returns to his original form. The Super X II disables the transmitter, releasing Godzilla from their control, and the mutant dinosaur returns to the ocean with humanity indebted to him for his aide.

Reception

GamePro opined that the visuals and sounds "capture the essence of Godzilla movies" but that the gameplay moves too slow, with extensive time spent on a dull map screen culminating in battles which consist mostly of non-interactive cinemas. They concluded the game to be only for hardcore Godzilla fans. Electronic Gaming Monthly similarly criticized that the map roaming is too slow and boring and the battles are too lacking in interactivity, and additionally complained that frustrating "cheap hits" were too common. They gave the game a score of 6 out of 10.

References

External links
 Toho Kingdom
 Super Godzilla at GameFAQs
 Super Godzilla at MobyGames

1993 video games
Godzilla games
Science fiction video games
Super Nintendo Entertainment System games
Super Nintendo Entertainment System-only games
Video games about extraterrestrial life
Video games set in Japan
Video games developed in Japan
Single-player video games
Action video games
Toho